The Coward is a 1915 American silent historical war drama film directed by Reginald Barker and produced by Thomas H. Ince. Ince also wrote the film's scenario with C. Gardner Sullivan, from a story Ince had bought from writer (and future director) Edward Sloman. The film stars Frank Keenan and Charles Ray. John Gilbert also appears in an uncredited bit part. A copy of The Coward is preserved at the Museum of Modern Art.

Plot
Set during the American Civil War, Keenan stars as a Virginia colonel, with Charles Ray as his weak-willed son. The son is forced, at gunpoint, by his father to enlist in the Confederate States Army.  He is terrified by the war and deserts during a battle.  The film focuses on the son's struggle to overcome his cowardice.

Cast
 Frank Keenan as Col. Jefferson Beverly Winslow
 Charles Ray as Frank Winslow
 Gertrude Claire as Mrs. Elizabeth Winslow
 Nick Cogley as a Negro Servant
 Charles K. French	 as a Confederate Commander
 Margaret Gibson as Amy 
 Minnie Provost as  Mammy 
 John Gilbert as a Young Virginian (uncredited)
 Bob Kortman as a Union Officer (uncredited)
 Leo Willis as a Union Soldier (uncredited)

Reception
The Coward was both a critical and financial success and helped to launch Charles Ray's career.

Criticism
Unusually at the time, the main character is not presented as a gallant Southerner who is eager to fight in the war.

The acting in this film was much more natural than earlier films, with cutting and camera angles helping the actor's use of facial expressions and pauses to convey dramatic tension.

References

External links 

1915 films
1910s historical drama films
1910s war drama films
American Civil War films
American historical drama films
American silent feature films
American war drama films
American black-and-white films
Films set in Virginia
Films set in the 1860s
Surviving American silent films
Triangle Film Corporation films
Films set in Richmond, Virginia
Films directed by Reginald Barker
1910s American films
Silent American drama films
Silent war drama films